is a phenomenon in Spanish grammar, the omission of a preposition, usually , which, in Standard Spanish, would precede the conjunction (or complementizer) . For example, "" ("I didn't realize you had come"): compare standard "".  is frowned upon by prescriptive grammar.

Although the omitted preposition is typically , other prepositions occasionally are also subject to omission by : "" ("I insist that you go"); compare standard "".

 may be, in some cases, a hypercorrective reaction to : the insertion of  before  where it would not appear in standard Spanish, which is considered a much more serious and socially stigmatized mistake, but which is nevertheless widespread in both Peninsular and American Spanish.

References
 Bentivoglio, Paola. 1975. "" In Frances M. Aid, Melvyn C. Resnick, and Bohdan Saciuk (eds.), Colloquium on Hispanic Linguistics (Washington: Georgetown University Press), pp. 1–18. .
 Carbonero, Pedro. 1992.
 Gómez Torrego, Leonardo. 1991. "" , 55: 23-44.
 McLauchlan, Jessica, 1982, "" , 6 (1): 11-55.
 Rabanales, Ambrosio. 1974. Also in Juan M. Lope Blanch (ed.),  (Mexico City: , 1977), pp. 541–569.

Spanish grammar

hu:Dequeizmus és queizmus